The Six Days of Berlin is a six-day track cycling race held annually in Berlin, Germany. The event was first held in 1909. In its first edition, 15 teams of two cyclists each competed in the exhibition hall at Berlin Zoo for glory and, not least, 5000 Goldmarks. Klaus Bugdahl holds the record of victories with nine.

The time when the 6 day race is held is sometimes just in the middle of the football season, the winter is severe, and football league in Germany had rather long winter break. In the past Bundesliga was suspended from mid December to mid February. Therefore, 6-day races were considered major entertainment events at that time (handball was to some extent).

In particular, the Berlin 6-day race, which has reached the 100th race at the 2011 competition, still has a large audience, and in the heyday it was held twice a season. Due to the race format declines in popularity and Global financial crisis in 2009, Six Days of Dortmund, Stuttgart and Munich folded successively. Another surviving 6 day cycling in Germany is Six Days of Bremen.

Starting from 2017, 6 Days of Berlin was incorporated into the Six Day Series organized by Madison Sports Group in attempting to rejuvenate the race format.

Winners

References

External links

Six Day Berlin 
 

Cycle races in Germany
Sports competitions in Berlin
Six-day races
Recurring sporting events established in 1909
1909 establishments in Germany
Six Day Series